Obinna Eregbu  (born 9 November 1969 in Owerri, Imo State) is a retired Nigerian athlete who competed in the long jump. His name, Obinna, means "Father´s heart". He is best known for his gold medal at the 1994 Commonwealth Games.

His personal best jump was 8.22 metres, achieved in the qualifying round of the 1994 Commonwealth Games. This ranks him fifth among Nigerian long jumpers, behind Yusuf Alli (8.27 m), Charlton Ehizuelen (8.26 indoor), Paul Emordi (8.25) and George Ogbeide (8.24).

Achievements

References

External links

1969 births
Living people
People from Owerri
Nigerian male long jumpers
Igbo sportspeople
Athletes (track and field) at the 1994 Commonwealth Games
Commonwealth Games gold medallists for Nigeria
Commonwealth Games medallists in athletics
Universiade medalists in athletics (track and field)
Universiade silver medalists for Nigeria
Medalists at the 1993 Summer Universiade
Sportspeople from Imo State
20th-century Nigerian people
21st-century Nigerian people
Medallists at the 1994 Commonwealth Games